The Kumabito (肥人 'Hi people') were a people of ancient Japan, believed to have lived in the west of Kyūshū in the Hi Province (肥国).

See also 

 Kumaso

References

Tribes of ancient Japan